Henry Richard "Huntz" Hall (August 15, 1920 – January 30, 1999) was an American radio, stage, and movie performer who appeared in the popular "Dead End Kids" movies, including Angels with Dirty Faces (1938), and in the later "Bowery Boys" movies, during the late 1930s to the late 1950s.

Life and career
Hall was born in 1920 in New York City to Joseph Patrick Hall, an engineer from Ireland, and his wife, Mary Ellen ( Mullen) Hall. The fourteenth of sixteen children, he was nicknamed "Huntz" because of his ostensibly Teutonic nose. He attended Catholic schools and started performing on radio at five years of age.

He appeared on Broadway in the 1935 production of Dead End, a play written and directed by Sidney Kingsley. Hall was then cast along with the other Dead End Kids in the 1937 film Dead End, directed by William Wyler and starring Humphrey Bogart.

Hall served in the United States Army during World War II. In 1943, he appeared in the USN training film "Don't Kill Your Friends" as moronic Ensign Dilbert the Pilot, who carelessly causes the death of a civilian and three servicemen.

In 1948, Hall was arrested for possession of marijuana. His trial, held in 1949, resulted in a hung jury.

Hall later played the increasingly buffoonish Horace DeBussy "Sach" Jones in 48 of "The Bowery Boys" films, gaining top billing when his longtime partner, Leo Gorcey, left the series in 1956. Hall and Gorcey reunited in Second Fiddle to a Steel Guitar (1966) and The Phynx (1969).

He also appeared in such films as The Return of Doctor X (1939), A Walk in the Sun (1945), Gentle Giant (1967), Herbie Rides Again (1974), and The Manchu Eagle Murder Caper Mystery (1975) opposite Gabriel Dell, another former Bowery Boy.

He was one of the celebrities featured on the cover of The Beatles' 1967 album, Sgt. Pepper's Lonely Hearts Club Band. In 1971, he co-starred with Art Metrano and Jamie Farr in the CBS situation comedy The Chicago Teddy Bears. His plans to produce a movie series, "The Ghetto Boys" (a take on the "Bowery Boys"), fell through. In 1973, Hall took part in Princess Grace of Monaco's Council for Drug Abuse, part of the Catholic Office of Drug Education.

In 1976, he appeared in Won Ton Ton, the Dog Who Saved Hollywood, and in 1977 he played movie mogul Jesse Lasky in Ken Russell's film Valentino. His later films included Gas Pump Girls (1979) and The Escape Artist (1982), the latter reuniting him with Gabriel Dell. His final film appearance was in Auntie Lee's Meat Pies in 1993. He performed in dinner theater productions and then retired in 1994.
 	
Behind Sach: The Huntz Hall Story by Jim Manago, published by BearManor Media in 2015, is the first biography of Hall.

Death
Hall died from congestive heart failure on January 30, 1999, at the age of 78 in North Hollywood, California. He was interred in a niche at All Saints Episcopal Church in Pasadena, California.

Filmography

Film

Television

References

External links

 

 

1920 births
1999 deaths
American male stage actors
American male film actors
American male radio actors
American Roman Catholics
American people of Irish descent
20th-century American male actors
United States Army personnel of World War II